Florent Sanchez Da Silva (born 2 April 2003) is a French professional footballer who plays as a midfielder for Eredivisie club Volendam, on loan from Lyon.

Club career 
Da Silva arrived in the Lyon academy in 2010 from US Meyzieu, signing his first professional contract with Lyon on 2 December 2020. After figuring several times on the team sheet in January 2021, Da Silva made his professional debut for Lyon on 6 February 2021 in a 3–0 win over Strasbourg.

On 31 January 2022, Da Silva joined Villefranche on loan until the end of the season.

On 2 January 2023, Da Silva joined Eredivisie side Volendam on a 6 month loan.

International career
Born in France, Da Silva is of Brazilian and Spanish descent. He is a youth international for France.

References

External links
 
 FFF Profile
 OL profile
 

2003 births
Living people
People from Vaulx-en-Velin
Sportspeople from Lyon Metropolis
Footballers from Auvergne-Rhône-Alpes
French footballers
France youth international footballers
French people of Brazilian descent
French people of Spanish descent
Association football midfielders
Olympique Lyonnais players
FC Villefranche Beaujolais players
FC Volendam players
Ligue 1 players
Championnat National players
Championnat National 2 players
Eredivisie players
French expatriate footballers
Expatriate footballers in the Netherlands
French expatriate sportspeople in the Netherlands